Chauliodus vasnetzovi is a species of viperfish in the family Stomiidae, first discovered in 1972.

See also
 Viperfish

References
 
 

Chauliodus
Fish of the Pacific Ocean
Western South American coastal fauna
Fish described in 1972